Farndon is a small village and civil parish on the Fosse road, 2.5 miles (4 km) south-west of Newark-on-Trent, on the banks of the River Trent. The population of the civil parish as of the 2011 census is 2,405. The A46 previously ran through the village until the development of a new dual carriageway bypass.

History
The name Farndon means "Fern Hill". It is thought to be the site of the Roman fort Ad Pontem or "the place by the bridges."

The village played a small part in the English Civil War. During the Siege of Newark in 1646, Farndon was occupied by a Parliamentarian regiment led by Sydnam Poyntz.

In the 19th century, farming, malting, willow growing and basket making were the main source of employment for men and women. There was also a village blacksmith, butcher, baker, a general store, and a cobbler. The principal proprietors are William Buck Esq. and W.R. Brockton Esq. There are also several smaller owners. The Duke of Newcastle is lord of the manor, but owns only a small portion of the land. The church, dedicated to St Peter, is a large and lofty edifice, with two side aisles, chancel and tower, in which are 4 bells. A good organ was put up in the church in 1851...on the Trent side in this parish are several malt kilns, also steam and wind mills. The Wesleyans and Primitive Methodists each have a chapel here."

In the 1930s sand and gravel was needed to build aerodrome runways at RAF Syerston and RAF Newton. Excavations on parts of the river bank revealed ample supplies. Today, those worked gravel pits have been transformed into a marina, the river widened and the marshy fields alongside drained.

St Peter's Church

The parish church of St. Peter was built in Elizabethan times, and is thought to be the third such church built on the same site since Saxon times.

Farndon Ferry
Until 1974, "there used to be a ferry across the Trent from Farndon to Rolleston."

In August 1948, "the title of Little Hero of Farndon was bestowed on 12-year-old Ronnie Ward, of Northgate, Newark, after he rescued a child from the River Devon by the Farndon Ferry on Thursday. Seeing the four-year-old boy in deep water, Ronnie swam out to him and pulled him to the landing stage from where he was carried back to his mother. Amazingly, Ronnie's parents knew nothing about the rescue until they heard the story from eye-witnesses, because their son was too modest to tell them."

Farndon Fields
During site investigations for the A46 road improvements in the area to the east of the existing Fosse road (the former Roman Fosse Way), a significant Late Upper Palaeolithic archaeological site was identified, and later excavated at Farndon fields.

The site contained a flint scatter, a spread of waste flakes produced by the working of stone using flint knapping to produce sharp edged tools. Dated by the use of Optically stimulated luminescence, it confirmed that the archaeology dated back some 13,000 years making it a rare open field site, as finds from this age were usually only found in caves, such as Gough's Cave and more locally at Creswell Crags, some 20 miles away. It is thought plausible that the same people who used this site also visited the caves at Creswell, and that the repeated visits to Farndon were part of their nomadic subsistence circuit during the year.

The finds at Creswell, showed that these hunters were also artists decorating both the caves and animal bone with depictions of horses, Ibex and other animals, the Robin Hood Cave Horse being one of the notable discoveries of this Creswellian culture.

Describing the finds at Farndon, as "the dream scenario" archaeologist Phil Harding, who is also an expert in shaping stone tools, said "As a flint knapper, you were there with them". It has been imagined that the hunters who produced the scatter, needed to use the new flint tools to flense animal carcasses at this seasonal camp, situated on a river terrace overlooking the River Devon near to its confluence with the River Trent.

Flora and Fauna
There are a number of sites in Farndon dedicated to nature conservation. Most notable amongst these is the Willow Holt, which is one of the few remaining survivors of the working willow holts that were a feature of many Trentside villages. The site is especially important because it houses an internationally-known collection of willows and hybrid species. Part of the riverbank is raised and forms a flood bank, either side of which is an interesting selection of cricket bat willows and hybrid balasam poplars. Wild flowers include meadow cranesbill, comfrey, angelica and meadowsweet and the water meadows host species such as Yorkshire fog, brown bent and cocksfoot. The site is now in the ownership of the Nottinghamshire Wildlife Trust, and is open to the public. Prior to this, the Holt was in the care of Brenda and Lever Howitt, two  renowned Willow conservationists.

Amenities
The village has a shop which includes a sub-post office, two pubs and a hairdressers. There is also a primary school, Farndon St Peter's, which is in the middle of the village. It replaced the old school c.1960. The headmaster who oversaw the transition between sites was Bernard Jackson known to generations of Farndon schoolchildren as 'Gaffer' Jackson. Gaffer's teaching mostly stressed English and Maths.

Sport
Farndon United Football Club which was started in 1970, played in the Newark Football Alliance League. In the 2005/06 season they won the treble becoming league champions and winning the Willie Hall and Sam Arnold Cups. This feat had only previously been achieved by league rivals the New Inn and the RHP Sports & Social football team. In 2015, the club's first team folded. 

The first known reference to a Farndon cricket team is 1853. In 1901, Farndon won the prestigious Ransome Cup. Throughout this period, Farndon played at various locations around the village. Eventually, there was a fixed ground established in a field just off School Lane. By the end of the 1960s, Farndon established a permanent spot for a ground, moving onto a playing field at the back of the Memorial Hall along Marsh Lane, where a pavilion was opened by Nottinghamshire stalwart Frank Woodhead in 1973. Farndon achieved prolific success throughout the 1970s, winning the Newark Cricket Alliance Division 1 three times. They currently play in the South Notts Cricket League, and are in the process of building a state-of-the-art pavillion which is due to be completed in 2023.

Bus services
 Marshalls
 90, 90A: Nottingham – Trent Bridge – Gamston – East Stoke – Farndon – Newark – Balderton
 23: Farndon – Elston – Long Bennington – Grantham – Please note that this is a school bus
 Premiere Travel
 54: Bingham – Flintham – Elston – East Stoke – Farndon – Newark

Notable People
William Bissill (1871-1936) — National Hunt horse racing jockey who rode in two Grand Nationals, coming second in the 1908 race. He is buried in Farndon Municipal Cemetery.

Jessie Bond (1853–1942) —  English singer and actress best known for her role in the Gilbert and Sullivan comic operas, lived in Farndon.

William Rippon Brockton (1838-1915) — 19th century horse racing jockey who came third in the 1870 Grand National, was champion National Hunt Jockey in 1880 and won the first Scottish Grand National in the same year. Brockton was born in Farndon and is buried in Farndon Municipal Cemetery. 

Graeme Davies (1937-2022) —  New Zealand born engineer, academic and administrator who lived in Farndon. 

Mark Fell  (1960-) — English cricketer who played first-class cricket for Nottinghamshire and Derbyshire between 1981 and 1985. 

Richard Howitt (1864-1951) — English cricketer who played first-class cricket for Nottinghamshire between 1893 to 1901. Howitt died in Farndon and is buried in Farndon Municipal Cemetery.

Patrick Huskinson (1897-1966) — RAF officer and fighting ace who became Director of RAF Armament Production during WWII and was born in Farndon. 

Brough Maltby (1826-1894) — Archdeacon of Nottingham who was vicar of St Peter's Church from 1864 until his death.

Jay McGuiness (1990-) — British singer, songwriter and actor who comes from Farndon.

Notes

External links

 Nottinghamshire: history and archaeology
 Farndon and Hawton United Benefice

Villages in Nottinghamshire
Newark and Sherwood